Singa Gätgens (born 1 April 1975) is a German actor and television host. She was the first host at the launch of the KiKa children's TV channel.

Bio
Singa Gätgens was born in Hamburg, Germany.

Neues vom Süderhof 
From 1991 to 1993, Gätgens played the role of "Bimbo" in the ARD children's TV series Neues vom Süderhof.

Work
She gained public attention through her work in Gegen den Wind (1995), Schloss Einstein (1998) and Beutolomäus (2001).

Filmography 
Gegen den Wind
Der Landarzt
Blankenese

References

1975 births
German television actresses
Living people